The 2009–10 Portland Trail Blazers season was the 40th season of the franchise in the National Basketball Association (NBA). In the playoffs, the Trail Blazers lost to the Phoenix Suns in six games in the First Round.

The team's roster is featured in NBA 2K20, NBA 2K21, and NBA 2K22.

Key dates 
 June 25 – The 2009 NBA draft took place in New York City.
 July 8 – The free agency period started.
 September 28 – Training camp begins
 October 6 – First preseason game
 October 14 – Commemorative 40-year anniversary game at Memorial Coliseum
 October 27 – First regular-season game
 March 16 – Tom Penn is relieved of his assistant general manager duties by owner Paul Allen.
 April 18 – Blazers begin playoff series with the Phoenix Suns.
 April 29 – Phoenix Suns defeat the Blazers in Game 6 of the playoff series.
 June 24, 2010 – Kevin Pritchard is relieved of his general manager duties by owner Paul Allen.

Offseason

NBA Draft

Free agency 
 Signed Andre Miller to a three-year deal
 Signed Juwan Howard to a one-year deal

Roster

Pre-season 

As part of the team's 40th-year celebration, the Blazers played a pre-season game at Memorial Coliseum on October 14, 2009 against the Phoenix Suns. Team founder Harry Glickman, former players Jerome Kersey, Terry Porter, and Bob Gross, as well as broadcaster Bill Schonely attended the game. The Suns defeated the Blazers, 110–104 with 11,740 tickets sold. All tickets for this game were $19.70 to represent the team's inaugural 1970 season.

Regular season

Standings

Record vs. opponents

Game log 

|- bgcolor="#bbffbb"
| 1
| October 27
| Houston
| 
| Travis Outlaw (23)
| Greg Oden (12)
| Andre Miller (7)
| Rose Garden20,403
| 1–0
|- bgcolor="#ffcccc"
| 2
| October 29
| Denver
| 
| Brandon Roy (30)
| Greg Oden (9)
| Brandon Roy, Andre Miller (5)
| Rose Garden20,218
| 1–1
|- bgcolor="#ffcccc"
| 3
| October 31
| @ Houston
| 
| Brandon Roy (42)
| Greg Oden (9)
| Steve Blake (6)
| Toyota Center18,100
| 1-2

|- bgcolor="#bbffbb"
| 4
| November 1
| @ Oklahoma City
| 
| Steve Blake (18)
| Greg Oden (10)
| Brandon Roy (5)
| Ford Center16,920
| 2–2
|- bgcolor="#ffcccc"
| 5
| November 3
| Atlanta
| 
| LaMarcus Aldridge (20)
| LaMarcus Aldridge (14)
| Andre Miller (11)
| Rose Garden20,325
| 2–3
|- bgcolor="#bbffbb"
| 6
| November 6
| San Antonio
| 
| Brandon Roy (24)
| Joel Przybilla (13)
| Andre Miller (4)
| Rose Garden20,498
| 3–3
|- bgcolor="#bbffbb"
| 7
| November 8
| Minnesota
| 
| Andre Miller (21)
| Joel Przybilla (13)
| Brandon Roy (7)
| Rose Garden20,306
| 4–3
|- bgcolor="#bbffbb"
| 8
| November 10
| @ Memphis
| 
| Brandon Roy (20)
| LaMarcus Aldridge (12)
| Brandon Roy, Andre Miller (7)
| FedEx Forum10,589
| 5–3
|- bgcolor="#bbffbb"
| 9
| November 11
| @ Minnesota
| 
| Martell Webster (16)
| Joel Przybilla, Greg Oden (11)
| Brandon Roy, Andre Miller (10)
| Target Center13,555
| 6–3
|- bgcolor="#bbffbb"
| 10
| November 13
| @ New Orleans
| 
| LaMarcus Aldridge (20)
| LaMarcus Aldridge (13)
| Brandon Roy (6)
| New Orleans Arena14,742
| 7–3
|- bgcolor="#bbffbb"
| 11
| November 14
| @ Charlotte
| 
| Brandon Roy (25)
| LaMarcus Aldridge, Rudy Fernandez, Brandon Roy (7)
| Brandon Roy (5)
| Time Warner Cable Arena15,872
| 8–3
|- bgcolor="#ffcccc"
| 12
| November 16
| @ Atlanta
| 
| Rudy Fernandez (19)
| LaMarcus Aldridge, Brandon Roy (9)
| Steve Blake (11)
| Philips Arena12,977
| 8–4
|- bgcolor="#bbffbb"
| 13
| November 18
| Detroit
| 
| Brandon Roy, LaMarcus Aldridge (19)
| Greg Oden (10)
| Andre Miller (11)
| Rose Garden20,391
| 9-4
|- bgcolor="#ffcccc"
| 14
| November 20
| @ Golden State
| 
| Rudy Fernandez (19)
| Joel Przybilla (9)
| Rudy Fernandez, Steve Blake (5)
| Oracle Arena18,630
| 9-5
|- bgcolor="#bbffbb"
| 15
| November 21
| Minnesota
| 
| Martell Webster (21)
| Martell Webster (13)
| Steve Blake (9)
| Rose Garden20,453
| 10–5
|- bgcolor="#bbffbb"
| 16
| November 23
| Chicago
| 
| Greg Oden, LaMarcus Aldridge (24)
| LaMarcus Aldridge (13)
| Brandon Roy (7)
| Rose Garden20,383
| 11-5
|- bgcolor="#bbffbb"
| 17
| November 25
| New Jersey
| 
| Greg Oden (18)
| Joel Przybilla (10)
| Andre Miller (6)
| Rose Garden20,322
| 12-5
|- bgcolor="#ffcccc"
| 18
| November 27
| Memphis
| 
| Brandon Roy (26)
| Greg Oden (10)
| Brandon Roy (9)
| Rose Garden20,540
| 12-6
|- bgcolor="#ffcccc"
| 19
| November 28
| @ Utah
| 
| Brandon Roy (19)
| Dante Cunningham, Joel Przybilla, Martell Webster (5)
| Brandon Roy, Steve Blake (4)
| EnergySolutions Arena18,051
| 12-7

|- bgcolor="#ffcccc"
| 20
| December 1
| Miami
| 
| Brandon Roy (25)
| Greg Oden (20)
| Andre Miller (6)
| Rose Garden20,417
| 12-8
|- bgcolor="#bbffbb"
| 21
| December 5
| Houston
| 
| Brandon Roy (28)
| Joel Przybilla (12)
| Andre Miller, Steve Blake, Brandon Roy, LaMarcus Aldridge (3)
| Rose Garden20,555
| 13-8
|- bgcolor="#ffcccc"
| 22
| December 7
| @ New York
| 
| Brandon Roy (27)
| LaMarcus Aldridge (13)
| Steve Blake (4)
| Madison Square Garden19,763
| 13-9
|- bgcolor="#bbffbb"
| 23
| December 9
| @ Indiana
| 
| Brandon Roy (29)
| LaMarcus Aldridge, Joel Przybilla (8)
| Steve Blake (6)
| Conseco Fieldhouse11,487
| 14-9
|- bgcolor="#ffcccc"
| 24
| December 11
| @ Cleveland
| 
| Brandon Roy (23)
| Joel Przybilla (11)
| Steve Blake (8)
| Quicken Loans Arena20,562
| 14-10
|- bgcolor="#ffcccc"
| 25
| December 12
| @ Milwaukee
|  (2OT)
| LaMarcus Aldridge (31)
| LaMarcus Aldridge (11)
| Andre Miller (7)
| Bradley Center15,973
| 14-11
|- bgcolor="#bbffbb"
| 26
| December 15
| Sacramento
| 
| Brandon Roy, LaMarcus Aldridge (25)
| Joel Przybilla (10)
| Brandon Roy (10)
| Rose Garden20,588
| 15-11
|- bgcolor="#bbffbb"
| 27
| December 17
| Phoenix
| 
| Jerryd Bayless (29)
| Joel Przybilla (10)
| Andre Miller (5)
| Rose Garden20,559
| 16-11
|- bgcolor="#ffcccc"
| 28
| December 19
| @ Orlando
| 
| Brandon Roy (33)
| Joel Przybilla (10)
| Miller, Roy, Webster, Blake, Bayless, Howard, Aldridge (1)
| Amway Arena17,461
| 16-12
|- bgcolor="#bbffbb"
| 29
| December 20
| @ Miami
| 
| Brandon Roy (28)
| Joel Przybilla (12)
| Brandon Roy (8)
| American Airlines Arena16,500
| 17-12
|- bgcolor="#bbffbb"
| 30
| December 22
| @ Dallas
| 
| Brandon Roy (23)
| LaMarcus Aldridge (12)
| Brandon Roy (6)
| American Airlines Center19,863
| 18-12
|- bgcolor="#bbffbb"
| 31
| December 23
| @ San Antonio
| 
| Jerryd Bayless (31)
| Juwan Howard (12)
| Jerryd Bayless (7)
| AT&T Center18,581
| 19-12
|- bgcolor="#bbffbb"
| 32
| December 25
| Denver
| 
| Brandon Roy (41)
| LaMarcus Aldridge (13)
| Andre Miller (8)
| Rose Garden20,664
| 20-12
|- bgcolor="#ffcccc"
| 33
| December 28
| Philadelphia
| 
| Brandon Roy (24)
| LaMarcus Aldridge (12)
| Andre Miller (7)
| Rose Garden20,640
| 20-13
|- bgcolor="#bbffbb"
| 34
| December 30
| Los Angeles Clippers
| 
| Brandon Roy (25)
| Jeff Pendergraph (13)
| Jerryd Bayless (8)
| Rose Garden20,505
| 21-13

|- bgcolor="#bbffbb"
| 35
| January 2
| Golden State
| 
| Brandon Roy (37)
| Martell Webster (11)
| Andre Miller (6)
| Rose Garden20,507
| 22-13
|- bgcolor="#ffcccc"
| 36
| January 4
| @ Los Angeles Clippers
| 
| Martell Webster (25)
| Jeff Pendergraph (7)
| Andre Miller (16)
| Staples Center15,104
| 22-14
|- bgcolor="#ffcccc"
| 37
| January 5
| Memphis
| 
| Brandon Roy (27)
| Andre Miller (10)
| Brandon Roy (9)
| Rose Garden20,278
| 22-15
|- bgcolor="#bbffbb"
| 38
| January 8
| Lakers
| 
| Brandon Roy (32)
| Juwan Howard (10)
| Andre Miller (7)
| Rose Garden20,629
| 23-15
|- bgcolor="#ffcccc"
| 39
| January 10
| Cleveland
| 
| Brandon Roy (34)
| LaMarcus Aldridge (13)
| Andre Miller (8)
| Rose Garden20,614
| 23-16
|- bgcolor="#bbffbb"
| 40
| January 13
| Milwaukee
| 
| Brandon Roy (22)
| LaMarcus Aldridge, Juwan Howard (7)
| LaMarcus Aldridge, Andre Miller (6)
| Rose Garden20,465
| 24-16
|- bgcolor="#bbffbb"
| 41
| January 15
| Orlando
| 
| Martell Webster (24)
| LaMarcus Aldridge (14)
| Andre Miller (9)
| Rose Garden20,650
| 25-16
|- bgcolor="#ffcccc"
| 42
| January 18
| @ Washington
| 
| LaMarcus Aldridge, Andre Miller (22)
| LaMarcus Aldridge (15)
| Jerryd Bayless (8)
| Verizon Center12,209
| 25-17
|- bgcolor="#bbffbb"
| 43
| January 20
| @ Philadelphia
| 
| Andre Miller (24)
| LaMarcus Aldridge (9)
| Steve Blake (5)
| Wachovia Center12,607
| 26-17
|- bgcolor="#ffcccc"
| 44
| January 22
| @ Boston
| 
| Andre Miller (28)
| Juwan Howard (12)
| Andre Miller (8)
| TD Garden18,624
| 26-18
|- bgcolor="#bbffbb"
| 45
| January 23
| @ Detroit
| 
| Martell Webster (28)
| LaMarcus Aldridge (8)
| Andre Miller (13)
| Palace of Auburn Hills19,114
| 27-18
|- bgcolor="#ffcccc"
| 46
| January 25
| New Orleans
| 
| LaMarcus Aldridge, Juwan Howard (16)
| Juwan Howard, Rudy Fernandez (7)
| Andre Miller (10)
| Rose Garden20,249
| 27-19
|- bgcolor="#ffcccc"
| 47
| January 27
| Utah
| 
| LaMarcus Aldridge (25)
| Juwan Howard (11)
| Andre Miller, Jerryd Bayless (4)
| Rose Garden20,384
| 27-20
|- bgcolor="#ffcccc"
| 48
| January 29
| @ Houston
| 
| Rudy Fernandez (25)
| Nicolas Batum (9)
| Steve Blake (9)
| Toyota Center16,129
| 27-21
|- bgcolor="#BBFFBB"
| 49
| January 30
| @ Dallas
| 
| Andre Miller (52)
| Juwan Howard (12)
| Steve Blake (3)
| American Airlines Arena20,078
| 28-21

|- bgcolor="#BBFFBB"
| 50
| February 1
| Charlotte
| 
| LaMarcus Aldridge (17)
| Nicolas Batum (9)
| Andre Miller (10)
| Rose Garden20,106
| 29-21
|- bgcolor="#ffcccc"
| 51
| February 3
| @ Utah
| 
| LaMarcus Aldridge (27)
| LaMarcus Aldridge (12)
| LaMarcus Aldridge (5)
| EnergySolutions Arena19,911
| 29-22
|- bgcolor="#BBFFBB"
| 52
| February 4
| San Antonio
| 
| LaMarcus Aldridge (28)
| LaMarcus Aldridge (13)
| Andre Miller (10)
| Rose Garden20,572
| 30-22
|- bgcolor="#ffcccc"
| 53
| February 6
| LA Lakers
| 
| LaMarcus Aldridge (16)
| Juwan Howard (7)
| Steve Blake (7)
| Rose Garden20,688
| 30-23
|- bgcolor="#ffcccc"
| 54
| February 9
| Oklahoma City
| 
| Andre Miller (22)
| LaMarcus Aldridge (15)
| Andre Miller (6)
| Rose Garden20,460
| 30-24
|- bgcolor="#BBFFBB"
| 55
| February 10
| @ Phoenix
| 
| LaMarcus Aldridge (22)
| Andre Miller (7)
| Steve Blake (12)
| US Airways Center18,190
| 31-24
|- bgcolor="#BBFFBB"
| 56
| February 16
| LA Clippers
| 
| Martell Webster (28)
| LaMarcus Aldridge (9)
| Andre Miller (12)
| Rose Garden20,265
| 32-24
|- bgcolor="#ffcccc"
| 57
| February 19
| Boston
| 
| Andre Miller (16)
| LaMarcus Aldridge (9)
| Martell Webster, Andre Miller (2)
| Rose Garden20,618
| 32-25
|- bgcolor="#ffcccc"
| 58
| February 21
| Utah
|  (OT)
| Brandon Roy (23)
| Marcus Camby (18)
| Andre Miller (5)
| Rose Garden20,565
| 32-26
|- bgcolor="#BBFFBB"
| 59
| February 23
| @ New Jersey
| 
| Brandon Roy (28)
| LaMarcus Aldridge (7)
| Andre Miller (7)
| IZOD Center11,138
| 33-26
|- bgcolor="#BBFFBB"
| 60
| February 24
| @ Toronto
| 
| Brandon Roy (20)
| Andre Miller, Rudy Fernandez (7)
| Andre Miller (10)
| Air Canada Centre16,161
| 34-26
|- bgcolor="#ffcccc"
| 61
| February 26
| @ Chicago
|  (OT)
| LaMarcus Aldridge (32)
| Marcus Camby (11)
| Andre Miller (7)
| United Center21,508
| 34-27
|- bgcolor="#BBFFBB"
| 62
| February 27
| @ Minnesota
| 
| Nicolas Batum (31)
| Nicolas Batum, LaMarcus Aldridge, Martell Webster (7)
| Brandon Roy (9)
| Target Center19,266
| 35-27

|- bgcolor="#BBFFBB"
| 63
| March 1
| @ Memphis
| 
| Brandon Roy (25)
| Brandon Roy, Marcus Camby (22)
| Andre Miller (11)
| FedEx Forum11,123
| 36-27
|- bgcolor="#BBFFBB"
| 64
| March 3
| Indiana
| 
| Brandon Roy (22)
| Dante Cunningham (8)
| Rudy Fernandez (5)
| Rose Garden20,623
| 37-27
|- bgcolor="#ffcccc"
| 65
| March 7
| @ Denver
| 
| Jerryd Bayless (24)
| Juwan Howard, LaMarcus Aldridge (7)
| Brandon Roy, Jerryd Bayless (5)
| Pepsi Center17,266
| 37-28
|- bgcolor="#BBFFBB"
| 66
| March 9
| Sacramento
| 
| Brandon Roy (19)
| Brandon Roy, Marcus Camby, Juwan Howard (8)
| Andre Miller (5)
| Rose Garden20,587
| 38-28
|- bgcolor="#BBFFBB"
| 67
| March 11
| @ Golden State
| 
| Brandon Roy (41)
| Marcus Camby (17)
| Andre Miller (7)
| Oracle Arena17,308
| 39-28
|- bgcolor="#BBFFBB"
| 68
| March 12
| @ Sacramento
| 
| Brandon Roy (28)
| Marcus Camby (7)
| Brandon Roy (4)
| ARCO Arena12,110
| 40-28
|- bgcolor="#BBFFBB"
| 69
| March 14
| Toronto
| 
| Nicolas Batum, LaMarcus Aldridge (22)
| LaMarcus Aldridge (12)
| Brandon Roy, Andre Miller (5)
| Rose Garden20,639
| 41-28
|- bgcolor="#BBFFBB"
| 70
| March 19
| Washington
| 
| LaMarcus Aldridge (19)
| Marcus Camby (19)
| Rudy Fernandez, Andre Miller (3)
| Rose Garden20,592
| 42-28
|- bgcolor="#ffcccc"
| 71
| March 21
| @ Phoenix
| 
| Brandon Roy (23)
| Marcus Camby (16)
| Andre Miller (9)
| US Airways Center18,422
| 42-29
|- bgcolor="#BBFFBB"
| 72
| March 25
| Dallas
| 
| LaMarcus Aldridge (20)
| Marcus Camby (11)
| Andre Miller (10)
| Rose Garden20,611
| 43-29
|- bgcolor="#BBFFBB"
| 73
| March 27
| @ New Orleans
| 
| Brandon Roy (28)
| Marcus Camby (14)
| Andre Miller (8)
| New Orleans Arena16,475
| 44-29
|- bgcolor="#BBFFBB"
| 74
| March 28
| @ Oklahoma City
| 
| Andre Miller (26)
| Marcus Camby (12)
| Brandon Roy (7)
| Ford Center18,203
| 45-29
|- bgcolor="#BBFFBB"
| 75
| March 31
| NY Knicks
| 
| LaMarcus Aldridge (21)
| Marcus Camby (10)
| Jerryd Bayless, Andre Miller (7)
| Rose Garden20,636
| 46-29

|- bgcolor="#ffcccc"
| 76
| April 1
| @ Denver
| 
| Andre Miller (24)
| Marcus Camby (8)
| LaMarcus Aldridge, Brandon Roy, Juwan Howard, Jerryd Bayless (3)
| Pepsi Center19,155
| 46-30
|- bgcolor="#BBFFBB"
| 77
| April 3
| @ Sacramento
| 
| Brandon Roy (24)
| Marcus Camby (15)
| Brandon Roy (6)
| ARCO Arena12,875
| 47-30
|- bgcolor="#BBFFBB"
| 78
| April 7
| @ LA Clippers
| 
| LaMarcus Aldridge (27)
| LaMarcus Aldridge (12)
| Brandon Roy (6)
| Staples Center16,790
| 48-30
|- bgcolor="#ffcccc"
| 79
| April 9
| Dallas
| 
| LaMarcus Aldridge (27)
| Marcus Camby (18)
| Brandon Roy (6)
| Rose Garden20,693
| 48-31
|- bgcolor="#bbffbb"
| 80
| April 11
| @ LA Lakers
| 
| LaMarcus Aldridge (24)
| Marcus Camby (17)
| Andre Miller (7)
| Staples Center18,997
| 49-31
|- bgcolor="#bbffbb"
| 81
| April 12
| Oklahoma City
| 
| Marcus Camby (30)
| Marcus Camby (13)
| Andre Miller (7)
| Rose Garden20,691
| 50-31
|- bgcolor="#ffcccc"
| 82
| April 14
| Golden State
| 
| Jeff Pendergraph (23)
| Nicolas Batum (12)
| Rudy Fernandez, Jerryd Bayless (9)
| Rose Garden20,482
| 50-32

Playoffs 

|- bgcolor="#bbffbb"
| 1
| April 18
| @ Phoenix
| 
| Andre Miller (31)
| Marcus Camby (17)
| Andre Miller (8)
| US Airways Center18,422
| 1–0
|- bgcolor="ffcccc"
| 2
| April 20
| @ Phoenix
| 
| Martell Webster (16)
| Marcus Camby (10)
| Andre Miller (3)
| US Airways Center18,422
| 1–1
|- bgcolor="#ffcccc"
| 3
| April 22
| Phoenix
| 
| LaMarcus Aldridge (17)
| Marcus Camby (10)
| Andre Miller (9)
| Rose Garden20,271
| 1–2
|- bgcolor="#bbffbb"
| 4
| April 24
| Phoenix
| 
| LaMarcus Aldridge (31)
| LaMarcus Aldridge (11)
| Andre Miller (8)
| Rose Garden20,151
| 2–2
|- bgcolor="#ffcccc"
| 5
| April 26
| @ Phoenix
| 
| Andre Miller (21)
| Marcus Camby (11)
| Marcus Camby (5)
| US Airways Center18,422
| 2–3
|- bgcolor="#ffcccc"
| 6
| April 29
| Phoenix
| 
| Martell Webster (19)
| LaMarcus Aldridge (9)
| Jerryd Bayless (7)
| Rose Garden20,313
| 2–4

Team statistics

Season 

Average Points Scored: 98.4

Average Points Allowed: 95.2

Average Point Spread: + 3.2

Quarter-by-Quarter Scoring: 24.6

1st in the NBA in attendance at 716,666 (20,476 per game)

Player statistics

Season 

|-
| 
| 78 || style=";"| 78 || style=";"| 37.5 || .495 || .313 || .757 || 8.0 || 2.1 || .9 || .6 || 17.9
|-
| 
| 37 || 25 || 24.8 || .519 || .409 || .843 || 3.8 || 1.2 || .6 || .7 || 10.1
|-
| 
| 74 || 11 || 17.6 || .414 || .315 || .831 || 1.6 || 2.3 || .4 || .1 || 8.5
|-
| 
| 23 || 23 || 31.2 || .497 || .000 || .581 || style=";"| 11.1 || 1.5 || style=";"| 1.1 || 2.0 || 7.0
|-
| 
| 63 || 2 || 11.2 || .495 || .000 || .646 || 2.5 || .2 || .4 || .3 || 3.9
|-
| 
| 5 || 0 || 5.2 || .250 || .200 || .500 || .2 || .8 || .2 || .0 || .6
|-
| 
| 62 || 2 || 23.2 || .378 || .368 || .867 || 2.6 || 2.0 || 1.0 || .2 || 8.1
|-
| 
| 73 || 27 || 22.4 || .509 || .000 || .786 || 4.6 || .8 || .4 || .1 || 6.0
|-
| 
| style=";"| 82 || 66 || 30.5 || .445 || .200 || .821 || 3.2 || style=";"| 5.4 || style=";"| 1.1 || .1 || 14.0
|-
| 
| 10 || 0 || 3.8 || .417 || style=";"| .500 || .571 || .2 || .5 || .0 || .0 || 2.6
|-
| 
| 21 || 21 || 23.9 || .605 || .000 || .766 || 8.5 || .9 || .4 || style=";"| 2.3 || 11.1
|-
| 
| 39 || 4 || 10.4 || style=";"| .662 || .000 || style=";"| .900 || 2.5 || .0 || .2 || .4 || 2.7
|-
| 
| 30 || 9 || 22.7 || .523 || .000 || .647 || 7.9 || .3 || .3 || 1.4 || 4.1
|-
| 
| 65 || 65 || 37.2 || .473 || .330 || .780 || 4.4 || 4.7 || .9 || .2 || style=";"| 21.5
|-
| 
| style=";"| 82 || 49 || 24.5 || .405 || .373 || .813 || 3.3 || .8 || .6 || .5 || 9.4
|}

Playoffs 

|-
| 
| style=";"| 6 || style=";"| 6 || style=";"| 38.2 || .430 || .500 || .750 || 6.0 || 2.2 || style=";"| 1.2 || style=";"| 1.8 || style=";"| 19.0
|-
| 
| style=";"| 6 || style=";"| 6 || 23.2 || .459 || .429 || .750 || 3.2 || .8 || .3 || .0 || 8.2
|-
| 
| style=";"| 6 || 2 || 27.7 || .431 || .400 || .792 || 2.7 || 3.8 || .3 || .0 || 13.5
|-
| 
| style=";"| 6 || style=";"| 6 || 29.7 || .421 || .000 || .500 || style=";"| 10.0 || 2.3 || .7 || 1.2 || 5.8
|-
| 
| 5 || 0 || 8.4 || style=";"| .600 || .00 || .833 || 2.6 || .0 || 1.0 || .0 || 4.6
|-
| 
| 2 || 0 || 3.5 || .000 || .000 || .000 || .0 || 1.0 || .0 || .0 || .0
|-
| 
| style=";"| 6 || 3 || 19.8 || .444 || .478 || .750 || 1.7 || 1.3 || .2 || .0 || 6.8
|-
| 
| style=";"| 6 || 0 || 14.5 || .526 || .000 || .000 || 2.7 || .7 || .2 || .2 || 3.3
|-
| 
| style=";"| 6 || style=";"| 6 || 35.0 || .405 || .429 || .775 || 3.2 || style=";"| 5.8 || style=";"| 1.2 || .2 || 15.7
|-
| 
| 3 || 0 || 4.0 || .500 || style=";"| 1.000 || style=";"| 1.000 || .0 || 1.0 || .0 || .0 || 2.0
|-
| 
| 0 || 0 || .0 || .000 || .000 || .000 || .0 || .0 || .0 || .0 || .0
|-
| 
| 3 || 0 || 5.7 || .500 || .00 || .750 || .7 || .0 || .7 || 1.0 || 2.3
|-
| 
| 0 || 0 || .0 || .000 || .000 || .000 || .0 || .0 || .0 || .0 || .0
|-
| 
| 3 || 1 || 27.7 || .303 || .167 || .778 || 2.3 || 1.7 || .0 || .0 || 9.7
|-
| 
| style=";"| 6 || 0 || 25.3 || .423 || .294 || .556 || 4.3 || .7 || .8 || .5 || 9.8
|}

Awards, records and milestones

Awards

Week/Month 
 Brandon Roy was named Western Conference Player of the Week for games played March 8–March 14.

All-Star 
 Brandon Roy was selected as an All-Star reserve (third All-Star appearance; did not play due to injury).

Season

Records

Milestones

Injuries and surgeries 
 July 9: Patrick Mills – broken foot; returned to active roster January 4
 September 9: Jeff Pendergraph – surgery to repair congenital hip disorder; returned to active roster December 21
 October 30: Nicolas Batum – surgery to repair right shoulder muscle tear; returned to active roster January 25
 November 14: Travis Outlaw – broken left foot; traded February 16
 December 5: Greg Oden – broken left patella; out for season
 December 5: Coach Nate McMillan – ruptured right Achilles tendon; returned to the bench December 15
 December 8: Rudy Fernández – surgery to repair sciatic nerve damage; returned to active roster January 13
 December 22: Joel Przybilla – dislocated right patella and ruptured patellar tendon; out for season
 January 2: Brandon Roy – strained hamstring; returned to active roster February 16
 April 11: Brandon Roy – right knee meniscus tear, arthroscopic knee surgery; returned to active roster April 24

Transactions

References

External links 
 2009–10 Portland Trail Blazers season at ESPN
 2009–10 Portland Trail Blazers season at Basketball Reference

Portland Trail Blazers seasons
Portland
Portland Trail Blazers 2009
Portland Trail Blazers 2009
Port
Port